Vico Canavese is a frazione of the comune (municipality) of Valchiusa in the Metropolitan City of Turin in the Italian region Piedmont, located about  north of Turin. It was a separate commune until 1 January 2019.
  

 

Cities and towns in Piedmont
Valchiusa